James Bertram may refer to:

James Munro Bertram (1910–1993), New Zealand writer and academic
James Bertram (musician), American indie-rock musician
James Bertram (Carnegie secretary) (1872–1934), secretary to steel magnate and philanthropist Andrew Carnegie
James Glass Bertram (1824–1892), Scottish author

See also